The Massacre Canyon battle took place in Nebraska on August 5, 1873 near the Republican River. It was one of the last hostilities between the Pawnee and the Sioux (or Lakota) and the last battle/massacre between Great Plains Indians in North America. The massacre occurred when a large Oglala/Brulé Sioux war party of over 1,500 warriors led by Two Strike, Little Wound, and Spotted Tail attacked a band of Pawnee during their summer buffalo hunt. In the ensuing rout, more than 150 Pawnees were killed. The victims, who were mostly women and children, suffered mutilation and some were set on fire. 

The Quaker agent John W. Williamson stated that 156 Pawnee were killed. This massacre ranked among "the bloodiest attacks by the Sioux" in Pawnee history. Cruel and violent warfare like this had been practiced against the Pawnee by the Lakota Sioux for centuries since the mid-1700s and through the 1840s. Attacks increased further in the 1850s until 1875. Historically the Pawnee were forced to give up what remained of their Nebraska homeland to the US Government after the Pawnee realized US Government were never going to honor any of the previous treaties. The Pawnee villages and Quaker agency near Genoa were attacked by the Lakota months and years prior without US Government protection as promised.

According to Indian agent John W. Williamson of the Genoa Agency, who accompanied the hunting party, "On the 2d [in fact the 3d] day of July, 1873, the Indians, to the number of 700, left Genoa for the hunting grounds. Of this number 350 were men, the balance women and children."

The Pawnee were traveling along the west bank of the canyon, which runs south to the Republican River, when they were attacked. "A census taken at the Pawnee Agency in September, according [to] Agent Burgess. . ." (see "Massacre Canyon Monument" article in External Links section) found that "71 Pawnee warriors were killed, and 102 women and children killed", the victims brutally mutilated and scalped and others even set on fire" although Trail Agent John Williamson's account states 156 Pawnee died (page 388). It is likely the death toll would have been higher, for Williamson noted ". . . a company of United States cavalry emerge[d] from the timber. When the Sioux saw the soldiers approaching they beat a hasty retreat." (page 387), although "Recently discovered military documents disproved the old theory" per the "Massacre Canyon Monument" article. This massacre is by some considered one of the factors that led to the Pawnees' decision to move to a reservation in Indian Territory in what is today Oklahoma. The Pawnee disagree.

Principal chiefs at the battle were:
Pawnee: Sky Chief, Sun Chief, Fighting Bear, Ruling His Son.
Sioux: Spotted Tail (Brulé chief) (unclear), Little Wound (Oglala chief), Two Strike (Brulé chief). Chief Charging Bear (John Grass, Sihasapa) .

Among the Pawnee dead were Sky Chief (Tirawahut Lesharo) who was surrounded and killed by the Sioux while skinning a buffalo, and the wife and four children of Traveling Bear, a former sergeant in the Pawnee Scouts who served under Maj. Frank North and a Medal of Honor recipient.

History

The Pawnee Indians had a long tradition of living in present-day Nebraska. Their first land cession to the United States took place in 1833 when they sold land south of the Platte River. The Massacre Canyon battlefield near Republican River is located within this area. Forty years and two land cessions later, the tribe lived in a small reservation on old Pawnee land, present-day Nance County. The Pawnees had kept a right to hunt buffalo on their vast, ancient range between the Loup, Platte and Republican rivers in Nebraska and south into northern Kansas, now territory of the United States. They had suffered continual attacks by the Sioux that increased violently in the early 1840s.

The Sioux lived north of the Pawnee. In 1868 they had entered into a treaty with the United States and agreed to live in the Great Sioux Reservation in present-day South Dakota. By Article 11 they (also) received a right to hunt along the Republican, almost 200 miles south of the reservation.

Both the Pawnee and the Sioux complained regularly over attacks by the other tribe. An attempt to make peace in 1871 with the United States as intermediary came to nothing.

Lead-up to the battle

A Pawnee hunting group—roughly 400 men, women and children—were located in camp near present-day Trenton on August 4, 1873. Trail Agent John W. Williamson stayed in the camp, and with him the younger Lester Beach Platt, a visitor from the east. All were homeward-bound for the reservation after a fine hunt.

Sioux chiefs Little Wound and Pawnee Killer and their followers of Cut-off Oglalas had hunted along tributaries to the Republican further west. In July the sub-agent in camp, Antoine Janis, banned an expedition against the Utes to avenge the loss of a man and some horses. The camp moved closer to the Republican.

About 700 Brule-Sioux Indians sought out buffalo on these Nebraska hunting grounds in early August, in addition. Chief Two Strikes was in the camp and Sub-agent Stephen F. Eastes.

Some Oglalas brought news of the big Pawnee camp on August 3. Chief Little Wound told Antoine Janis that he had stopped them from going against the Utes. Now, "the young men had determined to fight" the Pawnees, not to lose men and horses again. Janis said he had no order to keep them from fighting the Pawnee here. His suggestion to meet and talk with their enemy was turned down. Later he told his sister, Susan Bordeaux Bettelyoun, that to restrain the warriors "... you might as well stop an avalanche".

All Sioux tipis in the area got the news. A boy eyewitness recalled many years later that "instantly all the warriors began to get ready to go on the warpath ...". In his understanding, the braves defended their hunting grounds. During the day around 1000 warriors set off for the Pawnee to make a joint, quick attack and prevent the enemy from striking first.

Trail Agent Williamson's account
John Williamson, 23, was assigned as the Pawnee trail-agent at the Genoa Agency, the Pawnee  reservation, and accompanied the Pawnee on their hunt. He wrote his recollections of the battle decades after the incident.

"On the fourth day of August we reached the north bank of the Republican River and went into camp. At 9 o'clock that evening, three white men came into camp and reported to me that a large band of Sioux warriors [was] camped 25 miles [40 km] northwest, waiting for an opportunity to attack the Pawnees for several days, anticipating that we would move up the river where buffaloes were feeding. Previous to this, white men visited us and warned us to be on our guard against Sioux attacks, and I was a trifle skeptical as to the truth of the story told by our white visitors. But one of the men, a young man about my age at the time, appeared to be so sincere in his efforts to impress upon me that the warning should be heeded, that I took him to Sky Chief who was in command that day, for a conference. Sky Chief said the men were liars; that they wanted to scare the Pawnees away from the hunting grounds so that white men could kill buffaloes for hides. He told me I was squaw and a coward. I took exception to his remarks, and retorted: 'I will go as far as you dare go. Don't forget that.'

"The following morning August 5, we broke camp and started north, up the divide between the Republican and the Frenchman Rivers. Soon after leaving camp, Sky Chief rode up to me and extending his hand said, 'Shake, brother.' He recalled our little unpleasantness the night previous and said he did not believe there was cause for alarm, and was so impressed with the belief that he had not taken the precaution to throw out scouts in the direction the Sioux were reported to be. A few minutes later a buffalo scout signaled that buffaloes had been sighted in the distance, and Sky Chief rode off to engage in the hunt. I never saw him again. He had killed a buffalo and was skinning it when the advance guard of the Sioux shot and wounded him. The Chief attempted to reach his horse, but before he was able to mount, several of the enemy surrounded him. He died fighting. A Pawnee, who was skinning a buffalo a short distance away but managed to escape, told me how Sky Chief died."

The battle
The morning of August 5 the Pawnees went up a canyon. Men looking for game took the lead and the families followed with loaded down packhorses. Soon after the battle was on.

A number of the Pawnee huntsmen in front seem to have been the first fatalities, lured into a Sioux trap by a decoy.

The Pawnee prepared for defense. Williamson with either Platt or the schooled Pawnee Ralph Weeks rode out to arrange a peace council, but bullets forced them back.

The Pawnees say that Sky Chief lived during the first part of the battle. He fought for his tribe, shouting words of encouragement to it. "Today I may see the tribe you protect here. This is the end. It is supposed to be better old men not to become. Now, men, a man be." He killed his own little son with his knife, telling the Sioux that they would not get his child.

Sky Chief covered the retreat of his people, and the Sioux encircled him. He was alone and on foot. Dog Chief, a younger brother of Sky Chief, rode through the Sioux line and told him to withdraw. Sky Chief refused to stop fighting, while the enemies were killing Pawnee women and children. Knowing he himself would be killed, he took off his bear claw necklace, which was the symbol of his chieftainship. "Take the necklace and try to escape... I want you to have it and do not want the Sioux to gain possession of it."  Dog Chief managed to bring the necklace in safety.

The Pawnee version of the Massacre Canyon battle tells of a few individuals' fate and relates some peculiar incidents.

The Sioux proved too strong. Women threw hides, dried meat and saddles from the packhorses and the Pawnee started a disorganized retreat. "The withdrawal was a rout as the Sioux shot from both banks of the canyon into the fleeing Pawnee". In Culbertson, ten miles east of the battlefield, the residents heard the sound of gunfire.

East of Culbertson camped Capt. Charles Meinhold with his small command from Fort McPherson, by twist of fate. All through the morning Pawnee survivors found the camp as well as Williamson and Platt, who had made his escape early during the fight. The Pawnees got instructions to proceed further east.

The next hours and days
The US cavalry soldiers rode up the canyon in the afternoon. "The first body we came upon was that of a woman", remembered Platt. Army Dr. David Franklin Powell described the march up the battleground: "We advanced from the mouth of the ravine to its head and found fifty-nine dead Pawnees ...". For one reason or another, a number of the dead women lay naked.

Sometime after the battle the Sioux warriors rode into camps. "One of the men in advance was waving a scalp. This caused great excitement. The men paraded around the village ... Everybody appeared to be happy and rejoicing". Later well-known Sioux Indian Luther Standing Bear got the impression that "about three hundred Pawnees were killed". Eastes reported one Sioux killed and some badly wounded. The Cut-off Oglalas had suffered no casualties at all, according to their sub-agent. This is at odds with narratives of what happened in the canyon that day.

People from the nearest communities visited the scene of the battle over the following days. Royal Buck wrote to the readers of Nebraska City News that "It was a massacre and nothing more, and near 100 victims are lying on the ground and full two thirds are squaws and pappooses [small Indian children]".

News of the defeat reached the remaining Pawnees in the reservation on August 8 through a runner. "This produced intense excitement in the village, sorrowful wailings were heard all day".

The Pawnee survivors made the 80 miles or so to Plum Creek near the Platte. Here Dr. William M. Bancroft gave professional assistance to the wounded. By train they arrived at Silver Creek, around ten miles south of the Pawnee Agency. The last tribal buffalo hunt of the Pawnee in Nebraska ended soon after.

Afterwards
The last week of August, Williamson was back in Massacre Canyon. He covered the dead with dirt broken down from the banks.

The number of Pawnee victims on the battlefield range from at least 50 to "156". A source often quoted is Agent William Burgess, who stated that "20 men, 39 women and 10 children" were killed.

Pawnees taken captive were let loose after a request from the whites. Before long they joined their tribe.

The Pawnee received $9,000 for the loss of more than 100 horses, 20 tons of dried meat and all sorts of equipment. The money came from the annuities of the Sioux, as stipulated in the 1868 Sioux Treaty, Article 1.

This incident, in particular, caused the government nationwide to intensify "its efforts to keep the Indians confined to their reservation" in an endeavor to curtail intertribal warfare. On a local level, Maj. Gen. George Crook "dispatched a small force" to protect the Pawnee Agency. The presence of troops did not stop the Sioux raids.

In the Lakota winter count of Cloud-Shield, the victory is remembered as the winter "they killed many Pawnees on the Republican river." The Pawnee Indians talk about "The hunters that were massacred".

Dog Chief, being young, gave the bear claw necklace of his dead brother to the son of the Indian Agent Burgess for safekeeping. When some Pawnees tried to get it back, they failed. In 1920, Chawi Pawnee chief Lone Chief visited Burgess in Chicago and brought the necklace back.

It was half a century after the battle before the Pawnee and the Sioux smoked the pipe of peace during the Massacre Canyon Pow Wow in 1925.

Monument

The Massacre Canyon Monument was dedicated on Sept. 26, 1930. It was the first historical monument erected in Nebraska by federal grant. It stands on a three-acre (1.2 ha) plot, three miles (4.8 km) east of Trenton off U.S. Route 34, after having been moved from its original location overlooking the Republican River valley. The monument, a large stone obelisk, was constructed from Minnesota pink granite from a quarry in St. Cloud by R.P. Colling, Indianola, Nebraska. The entire monument weighs 91 tons (83,000 kg).

The monument is located in a small park area with picnic tables and a visitor center and museum that features exhibits about early pioneers, the tribal customs of the Sioux and the Pawnee people and a gift shop.

See also
 List of battles fought in Nebraska
 Pawnee Reservation

References

Bibliography
 Boughter, Judith A. The Pawnee Nation: An Annotated Research Bibliography (Lanham, MD: Scarecrow Press), 2004.

External links

Massacre Canyon Monument
 Nebraska Historical Marker: Massacre Canyon
LAST BUFFALO HUNT OF THE PAWNEES By John W. Williamson
"Massacre Canyon saga is just one story in a rich Native American history in Nebraska" - Nebraska Rural Living article
Massacre Canyon Monument and Visitor Center - Visit Nebraska

1873 in Nebraska
Conflicts in 1873
August 1873 events
Massacres in 1873
-
Lakota
Pawnee
Geography of Hitchcock County, Nebraska
Monuments and memorials in Nebraska
Tourist attractions in Hitchcock County, Nebraska
Buildings and structures in Hitchcock County, Nebraska
Conflict sites on the National Register of Historic Places in Nebraska
Massacres by Native Americans
Massacres of Native Americans
National Register of Historic Places in Hitchcock County, Nebraska
Battles in Nebraska